The Champion ("The Master"), released in some English-speaking countries as The Champion of Auschwitz, is a 2020 Polish sports drama film written and directed by Maciej Barczewski. It stars Piotr Głowacki as Tadeusz Pietrzykowski, a real-life Polish boxer who became famous for his nearly undefeated strings of victories in the Nazi concentration camps. The film also stars Rafal Zawierucha, Marcin Czarnik and Marian Dziedziel. The music was composed by Bartosz Chajdecki. This is the first full-length movie directed by Barczewski.

The film premiered at the Gdynia Polish Film Festival on 8 December 2020.

The Champion is notable for being the first film for which a foreign-language version (in English) was created in which the actors' facial movements are modified so that they appear to be speaking that language. The work was done using a technology similar to deepfake, proprietary to the Tel Aviv-based tech startup Adapt Entertainment, which bought the English-language distribution rights for The Champion so that it could serve as a proof of concept for its technology.

Development 
The film was announced in 2019. The shooting finished in January 2020. The movie was initially scheduled for release for 16 October 2020 but has been delayed with the new release date given as March 2021. The delay was likely caused by the impact of the COVID-19 on the Polish cinemas.

Cast 

 Piotr Glowacki as Tadeusz Pietrzykowski
 Rafal Zawierucha as Klimko
 Marcin Czarnik as Bruno
 Marian Dziedziel
 Martin Hugh Henley as Officer from Neuengamme
 Marcin Bosak as Lagerführer
 Piotr Witkowski as Walter 
 Grzegorz Malecki as Rapportführer
 Lukasz Szoblik as Bumbo

English-language version
The Tel Aviv-based startup Adapt Entertainment is based around proprietary machine learning process, named Plato, that uses AI to modify actors' faces within film and television shows in order to make it appear that those actors are speaking another language, as a substitute for dubbing. The software is similar to but distinct from deepfake technology. The company bought the English-language distribution rights to The Champion at the 2021 Cannes Film Festival for $100,000, after the film had seen financial success in Poland, as a proof of concept for its process. They then hired much of the film's original cast to be filmed at a studio speaking the film's dialogue in English, and used the resulting audio, as well as a combination of the old and new footage as training material, to infer the characters' facial movements to match the new dialogue.

Director Barczewski was supportive of the new version, saying he had wanted to additionally film The Champion in English but could not afford to do it.

References

External links
 

2020s Polish-language films
Polish boxing films
Polish World War II films
2020 films
2020 drama films
2020s sports drama films
Polish sports drama films